In baseball statistics, total bases (TB) is the number of bases a player has gained with hits. It is a weighted sum for which the weight value is 1 for a single, 2 for a double, 3 for a triple and 4 for a home run. Only bases attained from hits count toward this total. Reaching base by other means (such as a base on balls) or advancing further after the hit (such as when a subsequent batter gets a hit) does not increase the player's total bases.

The total bases divided by the number of at bats is the player's slugging average.

Hank Aaron is the career leader in total bases with 6,856. Albert Pujols (6,211), Stan Musial (6,134), and Willie Mays (6,080) are the only other players with at least 6,000 career total bases.

Key

List

Stats updated as through the 2022 season.

Notes

External links
Baseball Reference – Career Leaders & Records for Total Bases

Total
Major League Baseball statistics